Market Rasen Racecourse is a National Hunt racecourse in the town of Market Rasen, in Lincolnshire, England.

The course is a right-handed oval with a circumference of around one-and-a-quarter miles.  Although National Hunt racing is traditionally a winter sport, Market Rasen stages a year-round programme of racing.

Its most high-profile fixture is the Summer Plate meeting, normally staged on the third Saturday in July. This features the two-and-a-quarter miles Summer Hurdle and the eponymous Summer Plate, a two-and-three-quarter miles chase, both of which are among the most valuable National Hunt races staged in Britain during the summer months.

Notable races
 Prelude Handicap Hurdle
 Prelude Handicap Chase
 Summer Handicap Hurdle
 Summer Plate

References

External links

Official website
Course guide on GG.COM
Course guide on At The Races

 
Horse racing venues in England
Market Rasen